= Southland Park, Lexington =

Neighborhood in Lexington, Kentucky

Coordinates: 38°01′03″N 84°32′24″W

Southland Park is a neighborhood in southwestern Lexington, Kentucky, United States. Its boundaries are Pasadena Drive to the south, Clays Mill Road to the east, Lane Allen Road to the north, and Harrodsburg Rd to the west.

Neighborhood statistics

- Population in 2000: 1,358
- Land Area: 0.511 square miles (1.32 km^{2})
- Population density: 2,658
- Median household income: $56,755
